Belle maman (Step Mother) is a 1999 comedic French film starring Catherine Deneuve, Vincent Lindon, Line Renaud, Stéphane Audran, Idris Elba (in his debut), Françoise Lépine and directed by Gabriel Aghion. The title translates into English as "mother in law".

Plot 
A comedy about the ideal dysfunctional family in modern France, the grandmother is a lesbian, her girlfriend is mentally unstable, her daughter is a free spirit and her granddaughter is a seriously uptight attorney.

Antoine (Vincent Lindon) is all set to marry his pregnant girlfriend when he falls hopelessly in love with her mother, Léa played by the incomparable, Catherine Deneuve. The film is a fun and energetic romantic comedy with a couple of music scenes featuring Catherine Deneuve singing.

References

External links 

1999 films
1999 comedy films
1990s French-language films
Films directed by Gabriel Aghion
French LGBT-related films
1999 LGBT-related films
LGBT-related comedy films
Films scored by Bruno Coulais
1990s French films